The Purchase of Land (Ireland) Act 1885 (48 & 49 Vict. c.73), commonly known as the Ashbourne Act is an Act of the Parliament of the United Kingdom, passed by a Conservative Party government under Lord Salisbury. It extended the terms that had been achieved under the Kilmainham Treaty. It set up a £5 million fund and any tenant who wanted to buy land could do so. One could take a loan from the government and would pay it back in monthly installments.

The Act was effected by, and informally named for, Edward Gibson, 1st Baron Ashbourne, the then Lord Chancellor of Ireland.

The loans would be paid back over 48 years and the rate of interest would be fixed at 4% per annum. This made the loan repayments affordable, and more people could benefit from the Act as they would now be able to buy their own land. It strengthened the original Irish Land Acts as they had enabled tenants to buy land in restricted circumstances. The Ashbourne Act formally gave this right to the tenants and funded the Land Commission

It has been argued that the Act was passed to win the support of Charles Stewart Parnell. Salisbury knew that his government would not last long as the Liberal Party had an overall majority. Salisbury realised that he would need Irish Party support to maintain power. Therefore, the Ashbourne act was a way to win over Parnell while keeping William Ewart Gladstone on the opposition benches. This failed, as Gladstone came into government soon after and introduced the Government of Ireland Bill 1886; which however also failed.

The Ashbourne Act was extended in 1889. It increased the government grants for loans by a further £5 million and became law in August 1891.

It was one of the Land Purchase (Ireland) Acts.

See also
Irish Land Acts

References

United Kingdom Acts of Parliament 1885
1885 in British law
Land reform in Ireland
1885 in Ireland
Acts of the Parliament of the United Kingdom concerning Ireland